An aircraft engine, often referred to as an aero engine, is the power component of an aircraft propulsion system. Most aircraft engines are either piston engines or gas turbines, although a few have been rocket powered and in recent years many small UAVs have used electric motors.

Manufacturing industry

In commercial aviation the major Western manufacturers of turbofan engines are Pratt & Whitney (a subsidiary of Raytheon Technologies), General Electric, Rolls-Royce, and CFM International (a joint venture of Safran Aircraft Engines and General Electric). Russian manufacturers include the United Engine Corporation, Aviadvigatel and Klimov. Aeroengine Corporation of China was formed in 2016 with the merger of several smaller companies.

The largest manufacturer of turboprop engines for general aviation is Pratt & Whitney. General Electric announced in 2015 entrance into the market.

Development history

 1848: John Stringfellow made a steam engine for a 10-foot wingspan model aircraft which achieved the first powered flight, albeit with negligible payload.
 1903: Charlie Taylor built an inline engine, mostly of aluminum, for the Wright Flyer (12 horsepower).
 1903: Manly-Balzer engine sets standards for later radial engines.
 1906: Léon Levavasseur produces a successful water-cooled V8 engine for aircraft use.
 1908: René Lorin patents a design for the ramjet engine.
 1908: Louis Seguin designed the Gnome Omega, the world's first rotary engine to be produced in quantity.
 1910: Coandă-1910, an unsuccessful ducted fan aircraft exhibited at Paris Aero Salon, powered by a piston engine. The aircraft never flew, but a patent was filed for routing exhaust gases into the duct to augment thrust.
 1914: Auguste Rateau suggests using exhaust-powered compressor – a turbocharger – to improve high-altitude performance; not accepted after the tests
 1917-18: The Idflieg-numbered R.30/16 example of the Imperial German Luftstreitkräfte's Zeppelin-Staaken R.VI heavy bomber becomes the earliest known supercharger-equipped aircraft to fly, with a Mercedes D.II straight-six engine in the central fuselage driving a Brown-Boveri mechanical supercharger for the R.30/16's four Mercedes D.IVa engines.
 1918: Sanford Alexander Moss picks up Rateau's idea and creates the first successful turbocharger
 1926: Armstrong Siddeley Jaguar IV (S), the first series-produced supercharged engine for aircraft use; two-row radial with a gear-driven centrifugal supercharger.
 1930: Frank Whittle submitted his first patent for a turbojet engine.
 June 1939: Heinkel He 176 is the first successful aircraft to fly powered solely by a liquid-fueled rocket engine.
 August 1939: Heinkel HeS 3 turbojet propels the pioneering German Heinkel He 178 aircraft.
 1940: Jendrassik Cs-1, the world's first run of a turboprop engine. It is not put into service.
 1943 Daimler-Benz DB 670, first turbofan runs
 1944: Messerschmitt Me 163B Komet, the world's first rocket-propelled combat aircraft deployed.
 1945: First turboprop-powered aircraft flies, a modified Gloster Meteor with two Rolls-Royce Trent engines.
 1947: Bell X-1 rocket-propelled aircraft exceeds the speed of sound.
 1948: 100 shp 782, the first turboshaft engine to be applied to aircraft use; in 1950 used to develop the larger  Turbomeca Artouste.
 1949: Leduc 010, the world's first ramjet-powered aircraft flight.
 1950: Rolls-Royce Conway, the world's first production turbofan, enters service.
 1968: General Electric TF39 high bypass turbofan enters service delivering greater thrust and much better efficiency.
 2002: HyShot scramjet flew in dive.
 2004: NASA X-43, the first scramjet to maintain altitude.
 2020: Pipistrel E-811 is the first electric aircraft engine to be awarded a type certificate by EASA. It powers the Pipistrel Velis Electro, the first fully electric EASA type-certified aeroplane.

Shaft engines

Reciprocating (piston) engines

In-line engine

In this entry, for clarity, the term "inline engine" refers only to engines with a single row of cylinders, as used in automotive language, but in aviation terms, the phrase "inline engine" also covers V-type and opposed engines (as described below), and is not limited to engines with a single row of cylinders. This is typically to differentiate them from radial engines. A straight engine typically has an even number of cylinders, but there are instances of three- and five-cylinder engines. The greatest advantage of an inline engine is that it allows the aircraft to be designed with a low frontal area to minimize drag. If the engine crankshaft is located above the cylinders, it is called an inverted inline engine: this allows the propeller to be mounted high up to increase ground clearance, enabling shorter landing gear. The disadvantages of an inline engine include a poor power-to-weight ratio, because the crankcase and crankshaft are long and thus heavy. An in-line engine may be either air-cooled or liquid-cooled, but liquid-cooling is more common because it is difficult to get enough air-flow to cool the rear cylinders directly. Inline engines were common in early aircraft; one was used in the Wright Flyer, the aircraft that made the first controlled powered flight. However, the inherent disadvantages of the design soon became apparent, and the inline design was abandoned, becoming a rarity in modern aviation.

For other configurations of aviation inline engine, such as X-engines, U-engines, H-engines, etc., see Inline engine (aeronautics).

V-type engine

Cylinders in this engine are arranged in two in-line banks, typically tilted 60–90 degrees apart from each other and driving a common crankshaft. The vast majority of V engines are water-cooled. The V design provides a higher power-to-weight ratio than an inline engine, while still providing a small frontal area. Perhaps the most famous example of this design is the legendary Rolls-Royce Merlin engine, a 27-litre (1649 in3) 60° V12 engine used in, among others, the Spitfires that played a major role in the Battle of Britain.

Horizontally opposed engine

A horizontally opposed engine, also called a flat or boxer engine, has two banks of cylinders on opposite sides of a centrally located crankcase. The engine is either air-cooled or liquid-cooled, but air-cooled versions predominate. Opposed engines are mounted with the crankshaft horizontal in airplanes, but may be mounted with the crankshaft vertical in helicopters. Due to the cylinder layout, reciprocating forces tend to cancel, resulting in a smooth running engine. Opposed-type engines have high power-to-weight ratios because they have a comparatively small, lightweight crankcase. In addition, the compact cylinder arrangement reduces the engine's frontal area and allows a streamlined installation that minimizes aerodynamic drag. These engines always have an even number of cylinders, since a cylinder on one side of the crankcase “opposes” a cylinder on the other side.

H configuration engine

An H configuration engine is essentially a pair of horizontally opposed engines placed together, with the two crankshafts geared together.

Radial engine

This type of engine has one or more rows of cylinders arranged around a centrally located crankcase. Each row generally has an odd number of cylinders to produce smooth operation. A radial engine has only one crank throw per row and a relatively small crankcase, resulting in a favorable power-to-weight ratio. Because the cylinder arrangement exposes a large amount of the engine's heat-radiating surfaces to the air and tends to cancel reciprocating forces, radials tend to cool evenly and run smoothly. The lower cylinders, which are under the crankcase, may collect oil when the engine has been stopped for an extended period. If this oil is not cleared from the cylinders prior to starting the engine, serious damage due to hydrostatic lock may occur.

Most radial engines have the cylinders arranged evenly around the crankshaft, although some early engines, sometimes called semi-radials or fan configuration engines, had an uneven arrangement. The best known engine of this type is the Anzani engine, which was fitted to the Bleriot XI used for the first flight across the English Channel in 1909. This arrangement had the drawback of needing a heavy counterbalance for the crankshaft, but was used to avoid the spark plugs oiling up.

In military aircraft designs, the large frontal area of the engine acted as an extra layer of armor for the pilot. Also air-cooled engines, without vulnerable radiators, are slightly less prone to battle damage, and on occasion would continue running even with one or more cylinders shot away. However, the large frontal area also resulted in an aircraft with an aerodynamically inefficient increased frontal area.

Rotary engine

Rotary engines have the cylinders in a circle around the crankcase, as in a radial engine, (see above), but the crankshaft is fixed to the airframe and the propeller is fixed to the engine case, so that the crankcase and cylinders rotate. The advantage of this arrangement is that a satisfactory flow of cooling air is maintained even at low airspeeds, retaining the weight advantage and simplicity of a conventional air-cooled engine without one of their major drawbacks.
The first practical rotary engine was the Gnome Omega designed by the Seguin brothers and first flown in 1909. Its relative reliability and good power to weight ratio changed aviation dramatically.   Before the first World War most speed records were gained using Gnome-engined aircraft, and in the early years of the war rotary engines were dominant in aircraft types for which speed and agility were paramount. To increase power, engines with two rows of cylinders were built.

However, the gyroscopic effects of the heavy rotating engine produced handling problems in aircraft and the engines also consumed large amounts of oil since they used total loss lubrication, the oil being mixed with the fuel and ejected with the exhaust gases. Castor oil was used for lubrication, since it is not soluble in petrol, and the resultant fumes were nauseating to the pilots. Engine designers had always been aware of the many limitations of the rotary engine so when the static style engines became more reliable and gave better specific weights and fuel consumption, the days of the rotary engine were numbered.

Wankel engine

The Wankel is a type of rotary engine. The Wankel engine is about one half the weight and size of a traditional four-stroke cycle piston engine of equal power output, and much lower in complexity. In an aircraft application, the power-to-weight ratio is very important, making the Wankel engine a good choice. Because the engine is typically constructed with an aluminium housing and a steel rotor, and aluminium expands more than steel when heated, a Wankel engine does not seize when overheated, unlike a piston engine. This is an important safety factor for aeronautical use. Considerable development of these designs started after World War II, but at the time the aircraft industry favored the use of turbine engines. It was believed that turbojet or turboprop engines could power all aircraft, from the largest to smallest designs. The Wankel engine did not find many applications in aircraft, but was used by Mazda in a popular line of sports cars. The French company Citroën had developed Wankel powered  helicopter in 1970's.

In modern times the Wankel engine has been used in motor gliders where the compactness, light weight, and smoothness are crucially important.

The now-defunct Staverton-based firm MidWest designed and produced single- and twin-rotor aero engines, the MidWest AE series. These engines were developed from the motor in the Norton Classic motorcycle. The twin-rotor version was fitted into ARV Super2s and the Rutan Quickie. The single-rotor engine was put into a Chevvron motor glider and into the Schleicher ASH motor-gliders. After the demise of MidWest, all rights were sold to Diamond of Austria, who have since developed a MkII version of the engine.

As a cost-effective alternative to certified aircraft engines some Wankel engines, removed from automobiles and converted to aviation use, have been fitted in homebuilt experimental aircraft. Such conversions first took place in the early 1970s; and as of 10 December 2006 the National Transportation Safety Board has only seven reports of incidents involving aircraft with Mazda engines, and none of these is of a failure due to design or manufacturing flaws.

Combustion cycles
The most common combustion cycle for aero engines is the four-stroke with spark ignition. Two-stroke spark ignition has also been used for small engines, while the compression-ignition diesel engine is seldom used.

Starting in the 1930s attempts were made to produce a practical aircraft diesel engine. In general, Diesel engines are more reliable and much better suited to running for long periods of time at medium power settings. The lightweight alloys of the 1930s were not up to the task of handling the much higher compression ratios of diesel engines, so they generally had poor power-to-weight ratios and were uncommon for that reason, although the Clerget 14F Diesel radial engine (1939) has the same power to weight ratio as a gasoline radial. Improvements in Diesel technology in automobiles (leading to much better power-weight ratios), the Diesel's much better fuel efficiency and the high relative taxation of AVGAS compared to Jet A1 in Europe have all seen a revival of interest in the use of diesels for aircraft. Thielert Aircraft Engines converted Mercedes Diesel automotive engines, certified them for aircraft use, and became an OEM provider to Diamond Aviation for their light twin. Financial problems have plagued Thielert, so Diamond's affiliate — Austro Engine — developed the new AE300 turbodiesel, also based on a Mercedes engine. Competing new Diesel engines may bring fuel efficiency and lead-free emissions to small aircraft, representing the biggest change in light aircraft engines in decades.

Power turbines

Turboprop

While military fighters require very high speeds, many civil airplanes do not. Yet, civil aircraft designers wanted to benefit from the high power and low maintenance that a gas turbine engine offered. Thus was born the idea to mate a turbine engine to a traditional propeller. Because gas turbines optimally spin at high speed, a turboprop features a gearbox to lower the speed of the shaft so that the propeller tips don't reach supersonic speeds. Often the turbines that drive the propeller are separate from the rest of the rotating components so that they can rotate at their own best speed (referred to as a free-turbine engine). A turboprop is very efficient when operated within the realm of cruise speeds it was designed for, which is typically .

Turboshaft

Turboshaft engines are used primarily for helicopters and auxiliary power units. A turboshaft engine is similar to a turboprop in principle, but in a turboprop the propeller is supported by the engine and the engine is bolted to the airframe: in a turboshaft, the engine does not provide any direct physical support to the helicopter's rotors. The rotor is connected to a transmission which is bolted to the airframe, and the turboshaft engine drives the transmission. The distinction is seen by some as slim, as in some cases aircraft companies make both turboprop and turboshaft engines based on the same design.

Electric power
A number of electrically powered aircraft, such as the QinetiQ Zephyr, have been designed since the 1960s. Some are used as military drones.

On 18 May 2020, the Pipistrel E-811 was the first electric aircraft engine to be awarded a type certificate by EASA for use in general aviation. The E-811 powers the Pipistrel Velis Electro.

Limited experiments with solar electric propulsion have been performed, notably the manned Solar Challenger and Solar Impulse and the unmanned NASA Pathfinder aircraft.

Many big companies, such as Siemens, are developing high performance electric engines for aircraft use, also, SAE shows new developments in elements as pure Copper core electric motors with a better efficiency. A hybrid system as emergency back-up and for added power in take-off is offered for sale by Axter Aerospace, Madrid, Spain.

Small multicopter UAVs are almost always powered by electric motors.

Reaction engines

Reaction engines generate the thrust to propel an aircraft by ejecting the exhaust gases at high velocity from the engine, the resultant reaction of forces driving the aircraft forwards. The most common reaction propulsion engines flown are turbojets, turbofans and rockets. Other types such as pulsejets, ramjets, scramjets and pulse detonation engines have also flown. In jet engines the oxygen necessary for fuel combustion comes from the air, while rockets carry oxygen in some form as part of the fuel load, permitting their use in space.

Jet turbines

Turbojet

A turbojet is a type of gas turbine engine that was originally developed for military fighters during World War II. A turbojet is the simplest of all aircraft gas turbines. It consists of a compressor to draw air in and compress it, a combustion section where fuel is added and ignited, one or more turbines that extract power from the expanding exhaust gases to drive the compressor, and an exhaust nozzle that accelerates the exhaust gases out the back of the engine to create thrust. When turbojets were introduced, the top speed of fighter aircraft equipped with them was at least 100 miles per hour faster than competing piston-driven aircraft. In the years after the war, the drawbacks of the turbojet gradually became apparent. Below about Mach 2, turbojets are very fuel inefficient and create tremendous amounts of noise. Early designs also respond very slowly to power changes, a fact that killed many experienced pilots when they attempted the transition to jets. These drawbacks eventually led to the downfall of the pure turbojet, and only a handful of types are still in production. The last airliner that used turbojets was the Concorde, whose Mach 2 airspeed permitted the engine to be highly efficient.

Turbofan

A turbofan engine is much the same as a turbojet, but with an enlarged fan at the front that provides thrust in much the same way as a ducted propeller, resulting in improved fuel efficiency. Though the fan creates thrust like a propeller, the surrounding duct frees it from many of the restrictions that limit propeller performance. This operation is a more efficient way to provide thrust than simply using the jet nozzle alone, and turbofans are more efficient than propellers in the transsonic range of aircraft speeds and can operate in the supersonic realm. A turbofan typically has extra turbine stages to turn the fan. Turbofans were among the first engines to use multiple spools—concentric shafts that are free to rotate at their own speed—to let the engine react more quickly to changing power requirements. Turbofans are coarsely split into low-bypass and high-bypass categories. Bypass air flows through the fan, but around the jet core, not mixing with fuel and burning. The ratio of this air to the amount of air flowing through the engine core is the bypass ratio. Low-bypass engines are preferred for military applications such as fighters due to high thrust-to-weight ratio, while high-bypass engines are preferred for civil use for good fuel efficiency and low noise. Low-bypass turbofans can reach supersonic speeds, though normally only when fitted with afterburners.

Pulse jets

Pulse jets are mechanically simple devices that—in a repeating cycle—draw air through a no-return valve at the front of the engine into a combustion chamber and ignite it. The combustion forces the exhaust gases out the back of the engine. It produces power as a series of pulses rather than as a steady output, hence the name. The only application of this type of engine was the German unmanned V1 flying bomb of World War II. Though the same engines were also used experimentally for ersatz fighter aircraft, the extremely loud noise generated by the engines caused mechanical damage to the airframe that was sufficient to make the idea unworkable.

Rocket

A few aircraft have used rocket engines for main thrust or attitude control, notably the Bell X-1 and North American X-15.
Rocket engines are not used for most aircraft as the energy and propellant efficiency is very poor, but have been employed for short bursts of speed and takeoff. Where fuel/propellant efficiency is of lesser concern, rocket engines can be useful because they produce very large amounts of thrust and weigh very little.

Precooled jet engines

For very high supersonic/low hypersonic flight speeds, inserting a cooling system into the air duct of a hydrogen jet engine permits greater fuel injection at high speed and obviates the need for the duct to be made of refractory or actively cooled materials. This greatly improves the thrust/weight ratio of the engine at high speed.

It is thought that this design of engine could permit sufficient performance for antipodal flight at Mach 5, or even permit a single stage to orbit vehicle to be practical. The hybrid air-breathing SABRE rocket engine is a pre-cooled engine under development.

Piston-turbofan hybrid

At the April 2018 ILA Berlin Air Show, Munich-based research institute :de:Bauhaus Luftfahrt presented a high-efficiency composite cycle engine for 2050, combining a geared turbofan with a piston engine core.
The 2.87 m diameter, 16-blade fan gives a 33.7 ultra-high bypass ratio, driven by a geared low-pressure turbine but the high-pressure compressor drive comes from a piston-engine with two 10 piston banks without a high-pressure turbine, increasing efficiency with non-stationary isochoric-isobaric combustion for higher peak pressures and temperatures.
The 11,200 lb (49.7 kN) engine could power a 50-seat regional jet.

Although engine weight increases by 30%, aircraft fuel consumption is reduced by 15%.
Sponsored by the European Commission under Framework 7 project , Bauhaus Luftfahrt, MTU Aero Engines and GKN Aerospace presented the concept in 2015, raising the overall engine pressure ratio to over 100 for a 15.2% fuel burn reduction compared to 2025 engines.

Engine position numbering

On multi-engine aircraft, engine positions are numbered from left to right from the point of view of the pilot looking forward, so for example on a four-engine aircraft such as the Boeing 747, engine No. 1 is on the left side, farthest from the fuselage, while engine No. 3 is on the right side nearest to the fuselage.

In the case of the twin-engine English Electric Lightning, which has two fuselage-mounted jet engines one above the other, engine No. 1 is below and to the front of engine No. 2, which is above and behind.

In the Cessna 337 Skymaster, a push-pull twin-engine airplane, engine No. 1 is the one at the front of the fuselage, while engine No. 2 is aft of the cabin.

Fuel
Aircraft reciprocating (piston) engines are typically designed to run on aviation gasoline. Avgas has a higher octane rating than automotive gasoline to allow higher compression ratios, power output, and efficiency at higher altitudes. Currently the most common Avgas is 100LL. This refers to the octane rating (100 octane) and the lead content (LL = low lead, relative to the historic levels of lead in pre-regulation Avgas).

Refineries blend Avgas with tetraethyllead (TEL) to achieve these high octane ratings, a practice that governments no longer permit for gasoline intended for road vehicles. The shrinking supply of TEL and the possibility of environmental legislation banning its use have made a search for replacement fuels for general aviation aircraft a priority for pilots’ organizations.

Turbine engines and aircraft diesel engines burn various grades of jet fuel. Jet fuel is a relatively less volatile petroleum derivative based on kerosene, but certified to strict aviation standards, with additional additives.

Model aircraft typically use nitro engines (also known as "glow engines" due to the use of a glow plug) powered by glow fuel, a mixture of methanol, nitromethane, and lubricant. Electrically powered model airplanes and helicopters are also commercially available. Small multicopter UAVs are almost always powered by electricity, but larger gasoline-powered designs are under development.

See also
 Aviation safety
 Engine configuration
 Federal Aviation Regulations
 Hyper engine
 Model engine
 United States military aircraft engine designations

Notes

References

External links

 Aircraft Engines and Aircraft Engine Theory (includes links to diagrams)
 The Aircraft Engine Historical Society
 Jet Engine Specification Database
 Aircraft Engine Efficiency: Comparison of Counter-rotating and Axial Aircraft LP Turbines
The History of Aircraft Power Plants Briefly Reviewed : From the " 7 lb. per h.p" Days to the " 1 lb. per h.p" of To-day
"The Quest for Power" a 1954 Flight article by Bill Gunston
 

 
Engine